Harmonies for the Haunted is the second album by american indie rock band Stellastarr. It was released in the United States on September 13, 2005, by RCA Records. The album was released with the copy protection software MediaMax CD-3 in North America.

The song "Sweet Troubled Soul" featured in the film Aquamarine.

Track listing
 "Lost in Time"  – 4:31
 "Damn This Foolish Heart"  – 3:30
 "The Diver"  – 4:32
 "Sweet Troubled Soul"  – 4:07
 "Born in a Fleamarket"  – 2:34
 "On My Own"  – 4:53
 "When I Disappear"  – 3:48
 "Love and Longing"  – 4:18
 "Stay Entertained"  – 3:46
 "Island Lost at Sea"  – 10:27

The UK version (released March 6, 2006) includes an extra track, "Angela", inserted between "Love and Longing" and "Stay Entertained".

The iTunes version of the album does not feature "Bloated Wife," but instead includes "Precious Games" as track 11.

The vinyl LP version does not feature any of these bonus or hidden tracks.

Charts

Singles

References

External links 
 Official MySpace

2005 albums
Stellastarr albums
RCA Records albums